The Honda Quint is a subcompact car manufactured by Honda in Japan from 1980 until 1985. It was introduced in February 1980 in Japan as a five-door liftback version of the Honda Civic, being more upscale than the Civic, and was sold at the Honda Verno sales channel in Japan. The Quint was made available to export markets including Europe and Southeast Asia in 1981, with the export name being Honda Quintet. Beginning in 1983, this model was also sold in Australia as the Rover Quintet. The Quint was succeeded by the Honda Quint Integra in 1985.

This engine was coupled with a five-speed manual transmission or an optional two-speed semi-automatic with overdrive. A three-speed version of the semi-auto Hondamatic replaced this during 1982. Speed sensitive power steering (not on the base model) and fully independent suspension with MacPherson struts and front and rear anti-roll bars were also featured. The top models had air conditioning, central locking, electric windows, and electric sunroof. Japanese specified versions claim  because of the EP Engine JIS.

Australia 
Jaguar Rover Australia retailed the Honda Quint in Australia under the "Rover Quintet" name from 1983 through to 1985. Manufactured in Japan by Honda, the Quintet was the first Honda to carry the Rover badge. As the Rover Quintet, the interior received wood trim, as typified in the later Honda-based Rovers made in Britain, and the seats were trimmed in Moquette cloth. A Pioneer stereo radio cassette was standard. The Rover Quintet was replaced by the Rover 416i, a rebadged version of the Honda Integra.

References

External links 

 HONDAFAN :: Modele 1963 - 2011 :: Honda Quint / Quintet
 Honda Quintet - Japan 
 AROnline: Made in Britain...
 Rover Quintet: Australian Market website history

Subcompact cars
Quint
Cars introduced in 1980
Cars discontinued in 1985